Antonios Antonopoulos (Greek: Αντώνιος Αντωνόπουλος) (1805–1887) was a Greek politician of Achaia and a mayor of Patras.

He was born in Patras sixteen years before the Greek Revolution, in which he partook, being given the cross of the Order of the Redeemer. His father Dimitrios Antonopoulos was a delegate in the national council of Troizina (Troezen) and councillor.  His brother Ioannis Antonopoulos served as mayor of Patras and a Minister of Justice.

He was elected mayor of Patras in 1847 but the government opposed him, since he was an anti-monarchist, and deposed him the same day, staying in office for one day. Konstantinos Skourletis was appointed in his place.

Antanopoulos was elected in to the municipal council many times starting from 1841, while he also served as president of the municipal council.

Antonois Antonopoulos died in Patras on 26 January 1887.

References
City of Patras 
Patras mia eliniki protevoussa ston 19o eona (Πάτρα μία ελληνική πρωτεύουσα στον 19ο αιώνα = Patras, A Greek Capital During the 19th Century) Nikos Bakounakis, Kastaniotis publishers  Athens 1995
1836-206 Dimarchoi Patreon (1836-2006 Δήμαρχοι Πατρέων = Mayors Of Patras From 1836 Until 2006), Petros Psomas, Donti 

1805 births
1887 deaths
Mayors of Patras
Politicians from Patras